Best Young Player Award may refer to:

Association football
 Kopa Trophy, presented to the best performing player under 21
 Golden Boy, presented to the best performing young male footballer in Europe
 FIFA World Cup Young Player Award, FIFA World Cup for best young player of tournament
 FIFA Women's World Cup Young Player Award, FIFA Women's World Cup for best young player of tournament
 PFA Young Player of the Year
 Premier League Young Player of the Season
 Serie A Young Footballer of the Year
 Ligue 1 Young player of the year
 MLS Young Player of the Year Award
 K League Young Player of the Year Award
 J.League Best Young Player
 A-League Men Young Footballer of the Year
 A-League Women Young Footballer of the Year

Basketball
ACB Best Young Player Award
LNB Pro A Best Young Player
KML Best Young Player Award
PLK Best Young Player